Kentucky Route 3487  (KY 3487) was a  state highway in Georgetown in Scott County. The state highway ran from an intersection from U.S. Route 62 (US 62) and followed Cherry Blossom Way heading north to an intersection with KY 620. The road was decommissioned on August 5, 2021, with the road becoming part of an extended KY 620.

References 

State highways in Kentucky
Transportation in Scott County, Kentucky